Keith Lutz Horizon High School is a public high school located in Omaha, Nebraska, United States. The school first opened its doors on January 11, 2010 (due to snow days).  It is Millard Alternative High School and houses a few Millard Academies.

In 2005, Millard voters approved the fourth-largest bond project in district history, providing $78 million for the construction of Millard South; renovations to all three high schools, one middle school and one elementary school; and the purchase of new land and technology. Horizon was in this plan to become the alternative high school in 2010.

References

External links
 
 Millard Public Schools

Public high schools in Nebraska
Educational institutions established in 2010
High schools in Omaha, Nebraska
2010 establishments in Nebraska
Millard Public Schools